Parola is a city and a municipal council in Jalgaon district in the Indian state of Maharashtra. It is located on the Hajira (Surat)–Dhule–Kolkata national highway 6. The municipal council was established by the British government before the independence of India. This City is centuries old known for the two main features such as the Shree Balaji Temple and The Parola fort Also known as the native of Rani Laxmibai of Jhansi.

History
In 1859 town of Parola and its fort which belong to a member of Jhasi family ware confiscated by British government and the fort dismantled

Geography 
It has an average elevation of 261 metres (856 feet).

Demographics 
 India census, Parola had a population of 34,800. Males constituted 52% of the population and females 48%. Parola had an average literacy rate of 69%, higher than the national average of 59.5%: male literacy was 76%, and female literacy was 61%. In Parola, 13% of the population was under 6 years of age.

Connectivity

Road 
Parola is Situated on Asian Highway 46 NH 6 (National Highway – 06), well connected to Jalgaon, Dhule, Nasik, Nagpur, Pune, Mumbai and major cities of India like Surat, Ahmedabad and Kolkata.
Dhule'' is 35 KM West of Parola And Jalgaon is 56 KM East of Parola.

Now in 2020, The Highway NH6 construction is going on which will be an express Highway connecting east and west of India.Major City Connectivity from Parola.'''

 Mumbai is situated at 359 KM from Parola.
 Nashik is approx 194 Km form Parola
 Pune is approximately 375 KM from Parola
 Nagpur is around 486 KM from Parola
 Aurangabad is around 150 Km From Parola
 Ahmedabad is approx 538 Km From Parola

Railway 
The nearest railway station is Amalner on Western Railway, about 20 KM away.
 Dhule Station – 35 km
 Pachora Station – 45 km
 Chalisgaon Station – 56 km
 Jalgaon Station – 56 km

Airports 
The nearest airport is Dhule. The nearest international airport is Chhatrapati Shivaji International Airport, Mumbai.

Jalgaon Airport (ICAO: VAJL) is a public airport located off State Highway 186, 6 km south-east of Jalgaon, in the Nashik Division of Maharashtra.

Famous people

Sadashivrao Nevadkar established the city around the 17th–18th century. He was a cousin of the Great King of Jhansi Gangadharrao Nevadkar (the husband of Rani Laxmibai). King Gangadhar gifted the city of Parola to Sadashivrao as a jagir. Sadashivrao built the fort in Parola as well as five big gates called Darwajas. The fort and Delhi Darwaja still exist.
Shri Hari Narayan Apte: a famous Marathi writer who was born in Parola and then moved to Pune.

Balaji Temple 
It is a very old temple with a huge stone entrance called "Nagarkhana" and in front of the temple there is "Garudadhwaj".

Shree Chintamani Parshvanath Digambar Jain Temple 
Shree Parshvanath Digambar Jain Temple which is one of the oldest Jain temples (more than 200 years old) in the North of Maharashtra, is situated in Parola.

Attractions 

Parola is famous for Shree Balaji. Shree Balaji first arrived in Parola 345 years ago.  Every year, there is a procession for Shree Balaji which is very famous in Maharashtra and people gather to see the procession.

Parola is also famous for the fort, built by Khander rao around the 16th century.
Madkay maroti is also a famous temple in Parola.

In Parola, there is Old Jain Temple For Jainam. 16 No Bhagawan Shri Shantinath Bhagwan Derasahr maybe 1500 year old Murti and 150-year-old Shikharband Derasahr under by Kutchi Dasa Oswal Swetamber Trust

Famous Bhavani mata temple... which is well builded and decorated temple in the city.....it is know ( Bhavani Gad
) At time of Akshay tritiya....there is yatra of 12 bullock carts ... which is pulled by a maharaj (Bhagat)
In the navaratri...this temple attracts the people... locally this place also known as Zapat Bhavani temple..

References

External links
 Shree Parola Balaji

Cities and towns in Jalgaon district
Talukas in Maharashtra
Tourist attractions in Jalgaon district